The Newark Velodrome was a  bicycle track located on South Orange Avenue in Newark, New Jersey. It measured six laps to the mile, or 293 yards per lap. The track was built in 1907. The Newark Tornadoes of the National Football League also played several "home" games on the track's grassy infield, during the 1930 season, while the other "home" games were played at Newark Schools Stadium.

Football
The Tornadoes played two NFL games at the Velodrome in 1930, both defeats for Newark. On October 19, the Brooklyn Dodgers beat the Tornadoes, 14–0; a week later on October 26, the Staten Island Stapletons downed Newark, 6–0.

Cycling
The 1912 UCI Track Cycling World Championships were held in Newark. The event was sanctioned by the Union Cycliste Internationale, the world governing body for the cycling sport. The 1912 event was estimated to draw 20,000 fans, even though the seating capacity of the venue was just 12,500. Frank Louis Kramer won a gold medal at the venue that year. Australian cyclist, Reggie McNamara set five world records from one to 25 miles at the velodrome in 1915, 1916 and 1917.

Demolished
The Newark Velodrome closed in 1930 after its lease expired. It was demolished that same year.

See also
New York Velodrome

References

External links
Newark: Cradle of Cycling in the Sport's Golden Age
US Biking -Hall of Fame Inductees -2004
1930 NFL season summary

Orange/Newark Tornadoes
Velodromes in the United States
Defunct National Football League venues
American football venues in New Jersey
Defunct sports venues in New Jersey
Sports venues in Newark, New Jersey